is a Japanese voice actor, specialising in supportive anime roles.

Filmography

Television animation
 Ikkitousen series (2003), – (Moutoku Sousou)
 Tokko (2006), – (Takeru Inukai)
 Spice and Wolf II (2009), – (Gi Batos)
 Kingdom (2012) – (En)
 Yona of the Dawn (2014) – (Emperor Il)
 Gate (2015) – (Cicero La Moltose)
 Twin Star Exorcists (2016) – (Otomi)
 One Piece (2020) – (Babanuki)

Films
 The Saga of Tanya the Evil (2019) – (Andrew)

Original net animation
The King of Fighters: Destiny (2017) – (Goenitz)

Video games
The King of Fighters All Star (2018) – (Goenitz)
Granblue Fantasy (2018) – (Uncle Dan)
Black Clover: Quartet Knights (2018) – (Freese the Seer)
Pokémon Masters (2019) – (Additional voice)

Dubbing

Live-action
 Sympathy for Mr. Vengeance (2005) – (Mentally Disabled Person) (Ryoo Seung-bum)
 Horsemen (2009) – (Stingray) (Clifton Collins Jr.)
 Lavalantula (2015) – (Marty) (Michael Winslow)
 The Finest Hours (2016) – (Wallace Quirey) (John Ortiz) 
 Bohemian Rhapsody (2019) – (Jim Beach) (Tom Hollander)
 The Twilight Zone (2020) – Agent Allendale (James Frain)

Animation
 Teen Titans (2005) – (Robot Man)

References

External links
 Official profile
 

1972 births
Living people
Japanese male voice actors
Male voice actors from Tokyo